Blane Muise (born May 4, 1993), better known by her stage name Shygirl, is an English rapper, DJ, singer, songwriter and co-head/founder of record label and collective Nuxxe. Shygirl's music incorporates elements of dance music, industrial hip-hop, experimental pop, grime and deconstructed club. She has also been associated with the hyperpop music scene. Shygirl rose to prominence after working with close collaborator and friend Sega Bodega, as well as other well-known experimental producers Arca and Sophie, and gaining attention from the likes of Rihanna, who has used various Nuxxe tracks for her Fenty Beauty commercials and fashion shows. Shygirl has released various singles since 2016, and two EPs titled Cruel Practice and Alias. Her debut studio album Nymph was released on 30 September 2022.

Early life and career
Shygirl was born in South London and grew up around Blackheath. She is of Grenadian descent. She describes herself as a "total homebody" and "delving into fantasy and reading constantly" growing up. She was her secondary school's head girl. She went on to study practical photography at the University of Bristol, travelling back to London on the weekends for parties.

Shygirl released her first single "Want More", produced by Sega Bodega in 2016. This was the first song released on the Nuxxe label, founded by Shygirl, Sega Bodega, and Coucou Chloe. She went on to work with Sega Bodega on her singles "Msry" and "Nvr" in 2017, having featured on his song "CC" earlier in the year. In 2018, Shygirl quit her day job at a modelling agency to pursue her music career.

In May 2018, Shygirl released her debut EP, Cruel Practice, on Nuxxe. The EP received positive reviews from Pitchfork, Crack Magazine and Tiny Mix Tapes.

She featured on Arca's song "Watch" on her 2020 album, Kick I. The pair had previously collaborated on the song "Unconditional", with all of the proceeds from that single going towards Black Lives Matter and Inquest UK. In November 2020, she released her second EP, Alias on the Because Music label. This EP received positive attention from Pitchfork, Vogue and NME. Alias was listed as one of the best EPs of 2020 by audio and music publication MusicNGear.

In June 2021, Shygirl released a performance film titled "Blu". It featured performances of songs from her Alias EP, as well as a new song, titled "BDE" featuring British rapper slowthai. She released the song as a single the next day. She would later release the BDE 3XL remix EP in September. Shygirl and British producer Mura Masa were additionally featured on a remix of Lady Gaga and Blackpink's "Sour Candy" on Lady Gaga's Dawn of Chromatica remix album.

In September 2022, Shygirl released her debut studio album titled Nymph. The album received positive reviews from NME, Crack Magazine and Pitchfork.

Influences 
Shygirl has listed Mariah Carey, Aphex Twin, Madonna, Rihanna, Björk, and Róisín Murphy as her biggest musical influences.

Discography

Albums

Remix albums

Extended plays

Singles

As featured artist

Other charted songs

Guest appearances

Music videos

Awards and nominations

References

Year of birth missing (living people)
Living people
English women rappers
Grime music artists
English hip hop musicians
English women in electronic music
21st-century English women singers
21st-century English singers
21st-century women rappers
English people of Grenadian descent
British hip hop singers
English people of Carriacouan descent
Rappers from London
Singers from London
English women DJs
Black British women rappers
21st-century Black British women singers
Because Music artists
1993 births